Andrew Grady Landers (born October 8, 1952) is a retired American college basketball coach who was head women's basketball coach at the University of Georgia from 1979 to 2015. 

Landers graduated from Friendsville (Tenn.) High School in 1970, then attended and graduated from Tennessee Technological University in 1974 with a degree in Physical Education.

In 1975, Landers began his coaching career at Roane State Community College, compiling an 82–21 record over four seasons before Vince Dooley made the 26-year-old his first hire as athletic director at Georgia.

The Lady Bulldog program Landers inherited had compiled a 37–85 record in its first six seasons and had virtually no budget.  However, in his first season, Landers led the Lady Bulldogs to a 16–12 record, and by his fourth year in Athens, he had taken them to their first of five NCAA Final Fours.  By 1985, the Lady Dogs were in the National Championship game.

During his career at Georgia, Landers was named National Coach of the Year four times and Southeastern Conference (SEC) Coach of the Year three times, and led the Lady Dogs to 23 NCAA Tournaments, five Final Fours, seven SEC regular-season titles, four SEC tournament championships, and 21 twenty-win seasons.  He coached two Olympians (who won a combined six Gold Medals), 11 Kodak All-Americans, and 25 future Women's National Basketball Association (WNBA) players. Landers was awarded the US Basketball Writers Association (USBWA) Coach of the Year award in 2000.  At the time he retired, Georgia's five Final Four appearances (all under Landers) ranked sixth among all schools.

Landers recorded his 600th career win in just 784 games, which at the time made him the fifth-quickest (out of fourteen total) NCAA Division I women's basketball head coaches to reach the mark. On February 24, 2013, Landers got his 900th career win in Georgia's 73–54 victory at Ole Miss. 

Landers was a member of the ninth group of inductees (the class of 2007) in the Women's Basketball Hall of Fame. He is also a member of the Georgia Sports Hall of Fame as the state's winningest college basketball coach at any level.

Landers announced his decision to retire on March 16, 2015. He finished his career with 944 total wins, which ranked fifth all-time among women's college basketball coaches.  He was succeeded by his then-assistant coach Joni Taylor.

Since his retirement, Landers has worked for ESPN and its sister-channel SEC Network as a women's college basketball analyst.

Personal life
He married the former Pam McClellan in 1981 and has two children, Andrea Lauren and Andrew Joseph.

Head coaching record
Sources:

See also
List of college women's basketball coaches with 600 wins

References

External links 
 Georgia Bulldogs bio
 Women's Basketball Hall of Fame Class of 2007

1952 births
Living people
American women's basketball coaches
Basketball coaches from Tennessee
Georgia Lady Bulldogs basketball coaches
Junior college women's basketball coaches in the United States
People from Maryville, Tennessee